Kaos Kommand 696 is the third album by Singaporean black metal band Impiety, released in 2002 through Osmose Productions.

The album is available in both regular and limited edition, the latter which contains two bonus tracks. Digipak version is limited to 4,000 copies and 500 on vinyl with the same bonus tracks. The artwork on the left is for digipak release while regular cover is on the right.

Track listing

Credits 
Shyaithan – vocals, bass guitar
Fyraun – All guitar
Fauzzt – drums
Recorded and mixed in July 2002, at Berno Studio, Malmö, Sweden
Produced by Impiety and Henrik Larsson
Engineered, mixed and mastered by Henrik Larsson
Cover art by Jean Pascal Fournier
Limited edition cover art and illustration by Desmond Sia
Logo by Christophe Szpajdel
Art and layout direction by Shyaithan
Layout and design by Christophe Herbaut and Impiety
Photos by Shameem
Additional vocals on 'Bestial Genocidal Goatvomit' by Ustumallagam of Denial of God

References 

 Osmose Productions

2002 albums
Impiety (band) albums
Albums with cover art by Jean-Pascal Fournier